Hector Cosmo Fisher (born 4 May 1901) was an English-Swiss-Thai tennis player and footballer.

Personal life
Fisher was born in Myaungmya, Burma in 1901 and baptised in Bassein, Bengal, British India in August 1902. He was the son of Henry Cosmo-Fisher (1874–1918) and Annie Fisher.  His father was an Anglo-Indian born in Bangalore. He had a younger brother, Colin Cosmo-Fisher (1903-1964).  He was described as a cosmopolitan "Burmese-Siamese-English-Swiss" athlete.

Fisher attended Oxford University, and played tennis there before he moved to Switzerland.

Tennis
Fisher was above all an excellent tennis player. He represented Switzerland during his tennis career and played in the Davis Cup in the years between 1931 and 1939. Fisher won the Swiss Open in Gstaad four times in 1923, 1928, 1929 and 1931. In 1925 he reached the quarter-finals of Wimbledon. He won the international tennis tournament in Wiesbaden in 1929 and an international tournament in Basel in 1930.

Football
Fisher was also a footballer and played for Montreux-Sports at least during the 1927–28 season.

He also played for FC Basel 1893 in at least one league match in 1930. Fisher joined Basel's first team during their 1930–31 season under Austrian head coach Gustav Putzendopler. He played his first test game for them on 25 October 1930 at home in the Landhof as Basel won 5–1 against La Chaux-de-Fonds. After playing in another test game against Biel-Bienne, Fisher played his domestic league debut for the club in the away game on 30 November 1930 as Basel played a 2–2 draw with local team Old Boys. Fisher was only the second English person to play league football for the club, in fact to date  he remains one of only three English players ever to play for Basel, the others being Archibald E. Gough between 1900 and 1902 and L. B. Trenchard Chaffey in 1901.

References

Sources
 Rotblau: Jahrbuch Saison 2017/2018. Publisher: FC Basel Marketing AG. 
 Die ersten 125 Jahre. Publisher: Josef Zindel im Friedrich Reinhardt Verlag, Basel.

External links
 
 
 
 
 Hector Cosmo Fisher on "Basler Fussballarchiv" Website

Note
(NB: Despite all efforts, the editors of these books and the authors in "Basler Fussballarchiv" have failed to be able to identify all the players, their date and place of birth or date and place of death, who played in the games during the early years of FC Basel.)

Swiss male tennis players
1901 births
Year of death missing
Alumni of the University of Oxford
FC Basel players
Association footballers not categorized by position
Swiss men's footballers